John Furlong (April 14, 1933 – June 23, 2008) was an American actor. He dubbed the voice of Russ Meyer in all of Meyer's film appearances.

Filmography

 Mudhoney (1965) - Calif McKinney
 Faster, Pussycat! Kill! Kill! (1965) - Narrator (voice, uncredited)
 How Much Loving Does a Normal Couple Need? (1967) - Dr. Martin Ross
 Finders Keepers, Lovers Weepers! (1968) - Customer
 Vixen! (1968) - Sam the Gas Station Attendant
 Blazing Saddles (1974) - Tourist Man (uncredited)
 Busting (1974) - Policeman
 The Gravy Train (1974) - Second Passenger
 Airport 1975 (1974) - Mr. Taylor - Passenger (uncredited)
 The Front Page (1974) - Duffy
 Adam-12 (11/19/74) as Bar Comic
 Supervixens (1975) - CBS Commentator (voice)
 Hustle (1975) - Waiter
 W.C. Fields and Me (1976) - Reporter (uncredited)
 All the President's Men (1976) - News Desk Editor
 The Gumball Rally (1976) - Man on Freeway
 Doc Hooker's Bunch (1976) - Blake
 One on One (1977) - Cop
 The Swarm (1978) - Cameraman
 Bloodbrothers (1978) - Banion's Bar Man #3
 Beneath the Valley of the Ultra-Vixens (1979) - The Director / Radio Announcer (voice, uncredited)
 The Postman Always Rings Twice (1981) - Sign Man #2
 Jagged Edge (1985) - Butler
 Odd Jobs (1986) - Readmont Owner
 The Trouble with Spies (1987) - First Russian
 Suburban Commando (1991) - Official
 Wyatt Earp (1994) - Clem Hafford
 The Desperate Trail (1994) - Zeb Hollister
 The Man Next Door (1997) - George
 Vampires (1998) - Father Joseph Molina
 The Theory of the Leisure Class (2001) - Emmet Masterson
 Maniacts (2001) - Prometheus J. Boley (final film role)

References

External links

1933 births
2008 deaths
American male voice actors